This is a list of Chinese football transfers for the 2020 season mid-season transfer window.

Super League

Beijing Sinobo GuoanIn:Out:Chongqing Dangdai LifanIn:Out:Dalian ProfessionalIn:Out:Guangzhou Evergrande TaobaoIn:Out:Guangzhou R&FIn:Out:Hebei China FortuneIn:Out:Henan JianyeIn:Out:Jiangsu SuningIn:Out:Qingdao HuanghaiIn:Out:Shandong Luneng TaishanIn:Out:Shanghai Greenland ShenhuaIn:Out:Shanghai SIPGIn:Out:Shenzhen F.C.In:Out:Shijiazhuang Ever BrightIn:Out:Tianjin TEDAIn:Out:Wuhan ZallIn:Out:League One

Beijing BSUIn:Out:Beijing RenheIn:Out:Changchun YataiIn:Out:Chengdu Better CityIn:Out:Guizhou HengfengIn:Out:Heilongjiang Lava SpringIn:Out:Inner Mongolia ZhongyouIn:Out:Jiangxi LianshengIn:Out:Kunshan F.C.In:Out:Liaoning Shenyang UrbanIn:Out:Meizhou HakkaIn:Out:Nantong ZhiyunIn:Out:Shaanxi Chang'an AthleticIn:Out:Sichuan JiuniuIn:Out:Suzhou DongwuIn:Out:Taizhou YuandaIn:Out:Xinjiang Tianshan LeopardIn:Out:Zhejiang Energy GreentownIn:Out:'''

Note

References

2020